The Copa de Tejas was a soccer tournament held in Houston. All games were played at the Reliant Stadium, home of the NFL's Houston Texans.

The participants were Club América, Everton and Pachuca.

The Copa De Tejas was a preseason summer soccer tournament hosted by the Houston Texans NFL franchise at Reliant Stadium. The tournament featured clubs from Liga MX and the Premier League. The tournament was created to help establish the Reliant Stadium as a soccer venue, as well as persuade Major League Soccer to award an expansion franchise to the Houston market, which was awarded in 2006 with the Houston Dynamo.

There were two preseason tournaments held, in 2003 and 2004. Mexican side, Cruz Azul won the first tournament, and fellow Mexican outfit, Club América won the second and final tournament.

Past champions

References 

Defunct soccer competitions in the United States
International club association football competitions hosted by the United States
2003 establishments in Texas
2003 in American soccer
2003–04 in Mexican football
2003–04 in English football
2004 in American soccer
2004–05 in English football
2004–05 in Mexican football
2004 disestablishments in Texas
Soccer in Texas